Florencio Martínez (born October 3, 1986), is a Guatemalan football forward. He currently plays for Cobán Imperial.

Club career
At the age of 20, Martínez had shown his scoring ability in the little time given to him in Suchi. Martinez is small in size but he possesses a speed unseen in most Guatemalan footballers, which was enough to promote him to Deportivo Suchitepéquez's 1st team earlier in the Apertura 2006 season. In 2007, he was sold to Municipal as a promising prospect, but during the off-season he was loaned to newly promoted side Deportivo Malacateco, so that the youngster could get sufficient playing time, something he wouldn't get on the stacked Municipal forward department in the upcoming 2007-2008 season.

Unfortunately his career did not take off and he moved to Zacapa before joining lower league side Antigua on loan in January 2009. He moved to Cobán Imperial for the 2009-2010 season.

International career
Martínez scored on his debut for the Guatemala national team against Venezuela in November 2006. He has earned 5 caps, scoring 1 goal. His latest international was a February 2007 UNCAF Nations Cup match.

References

External links

1986 births
Living people
People from Izabal Department
Guatemalan footballers
Guatemala international footballers
C.D. Suchitepéquez players
C.D. Malacateco players
C.S.D. Municipal players
Cobán Imperial players
2007 UNCAF Nations Cup players
Antigua GFC players
Association football midfielders